Marvin Stone Jr. (June 2, 1981 – April 1, 2008) was an American professional basketball player.

Stone was a native of Huntsville, Alabama. While attending Virgil I. Grissom High School he led Grissom to the school's second-ever 6A State Title in 1999. The 6'10" center/power forward was regarded as one of the top recruits in the country, as a Parade All American & McDonald's All-American. He was the most decorated Athlete that Grissom High School has ever seen. He was selected for the 1999 McDonald's All-American game, and signed for Kentucky. However, his career at Kentucky was largely disappointing. In two-and-a-half seasons at Kentucky, he averaged 5.3 points and 4.2 rebounds before transferring to intrastate rivals Louisville during the 2001–02 season. In one season at Louisville, he averaged 10.3 points, 7.1 rebounds, and 1.5 blocked shots.

Stone was undrafted in the 2003 NBA Draft, and later played professionally in Europe for a number of teams, including Ciudad de Huelva (Spain), Air Avellino (Italy) and Paris Basket Racing (France). In 2005, Stone failed medical tests of the German clubs ALBA Berlin and EWE Baskets Oldenburg due to "conspicuous cardiological results" and hypertension which were associated with his generally bad physical fitness, although it could not be determined if that was its cause or its effect.

Stone died of a heart attack on April 1, 2008, while playing for Saudi Arabian team Ittihad. He collapsed at halftime during a playoff game. He had signed with the team only days before.

See also
List of basketball players who died during their careers

References

External links 
College statistics at BigBlueHistory.net

1981 births
2008 deaths
Kentucky Wildcats men's basketball players
Louisville Cardinals men's basketball players
McDonald's High School All-Americans
Parade High School All-Americans (boys' basketball)
Sportspeople from Huntsville, Alabama
Power forwards (basketball)
Sport deaths in Saudi Arabia
Basketball players from Alabama
American men's basketball players